Skrmetta is a surname. Notable people with the surname include:

 Eric Skrmetta (born 1958), American public official
 Matt Skrmetta (born 1972), American baseball player

Croatian surnames